

Results
Arsenal's score comes first

Football League First Division

Final League table

FA Cup

References

1907-08
English football clubs 1907–08 season